Otto Ottosen Madsen (8 December 1904 – 3 August 1963) was a member of the Queensland Legislative Assembly.

Biography
Madsen was born in Warwick, Queensland, the son of Mads Madsen and his wife Christine (née Ottosen), both of whom were born in Denmark. His brother, Mick Madsen, played rugby league for Australia. Otto was educated at Tannymorel State School and Warwick State High School before attending the Warwick Technical College. He became a dairy farmer, working in Tannymorel, Killarney, and Yangan.

On 11 September 1924, Madsen married Nellie Inis Evans (died 1935) and together had two sons and two daughters. He died in Brisbane in August 1963 and accorded a state funeral.

Public life
Madsen won the seat of Warwick at the 1947 Queensland state elections, defeating the sitting member, John Healy of the Labor Party. He held the seat until his death in 1963.

During his time in parliament he held the following ministerial portfolios:
 Minister for Agriculture and Stock - 1957-1960
 Minister for Public Lands and Irrigation - 1960
 Minister for Agriculture and Forestry - 1960-1963

Madsen was also a councilor on the Shire of Glengallan in 1942. He was President of the Dairymen's Organisation and Eastern Downs District Council, and Deputy State President and Queensland Representative on the Australian Dairy Farmers Federation.

References

Members of the Queensland Legislative Assembly
1904 births
1963 deaths
National Party of Australia members of the Parliament of Queensland
20th-century Australian politicians